The North Park Dryden Historic District is a historic district in North Park, San Diego, 92104 along both 28th and Pershing Streets, bordered to the north by Landis Street and to the south by Upas Street. The community is a neighbourhood of early twentieth century American Craftsman Bungalows as well as Spanish Colonial Revival homes and California Bungalows built in the 1920s and 1930s. It features a high concentration of homes designed and built by the renowned Arts and Crafts era architect/builder David Owen Dryden.

On 23 June 2011, the San Diego Historical Resources Board (HRB) approved the establishment of the North Park Dryden Historic District. Of the 136 homes in the District, 100 were deemed of historic value. As well as recognising the community's contribution to the city's heritage fabric, the HRB also honoured the work of builder Edward F Bryans - including 15 of the homes in the District - with the designation of Master Builder.

Gallery

References

Bungalow architecture in California
Neighborhoods in San Diego
History of San Diego County, California
Historic districts in California
American Craftsman architecture in California